Björn Leivik (born July 9, 1948) is a Swedish politician of the Moderate Party. He has been a member of the Riksdag during the period 1998-2002 and again since 2006.

External links
Riksdagen: Björn Leivik (m)

Members of the Riksdag from the Moderate Party
Members of the Riksdag 1998–2002
Living people
1948 births
Place of birth missing (living people)
Members of the Riksdag 2006–2010
20th-century Swedish politicians
21st-century Swedish politicians